Who Owns that Song? The Battle for Subramania Bharati's Copyright is a 2018 non-fiction book written by Indian historian A. R. Venkatachalapathy. It explains the background of the nationalisation of the works of Indian poet Subramania Bharati.

References 

2018 non-fiction books
21st-century Indian books
Indian non-fiction books
Juggernaut Books books